Yushu (Yüxü) is a county-level city of Yushu Tibetan Autonomous Prefecture in Southern Qinghai Province, China. In 2010, the overall city's population was 120,447 and 56,802 live within the city core. There are around 356,000 people in the metropolitan area in 2020. Yushu is the fourth largest city in Qinghai.

The city seat is the town of Gyêgu (also known as Yushu and Jiegu in Chinese), built in the valley of the Batang River, a right tributary of the Tongtian, which becomes the Jinsha at their confluence. All of these makeups part of the Yangtze watershed. In fact, almost the entire area of Yushu Tibetan Autonomous Prefecture is nomadic pastureland, except for Yushu city. Traditionally, it is one of the oldest towns in Qinghai Province and it serves as a trade hub, situated at the crossroads of the important trade routes between Ya’an, Xining, and Lhasa. In the early days, Chinese traders brought tea bricks from Sichuan and transported them to other parts of the Tibetan regions such as Lhasa, Chamdo, and Golok, which were the best-known towns during that time.

Temples and Monasteries in Yushu

The city has a few monasteries in and around, it has also one mosque. Gyegu Monastery is located on the hill, while Thrangu Monastery and Domkar Monastery are located outside the city. There are also some famous religious sites such as the Wencheng Temple, the Gyanak Mani Stone Temple, and the King Gesar Museum. The Wencheng Temple is located 20 kilometers from the city center, while Gyanak Mani Temple is located 9 kilometers from the center. King Gesar Museum is located in the city center.

Festivals in Yushu City
There are a few famous festivals in Yushu City. Yushu Horse Racing Festival is the most famous one in Yushu City.
The Yushu Horse Racing Festival is a traditional festival that is normally held at the end of July to the beginning of August, depending on the dates in the Tibetan calendar. The festival site is located in the Yushu Tibetan Autonomous Prefecture of Qinghai Province in northwestern China and is held on the lush summer grasslands of the valley floor, to make for better horse-racing events.  Renowned as being the largest horse racing event in the Tibetan areas, the festival plays host to tens of thousands of Tibetans and tourists every year.

As well as being famed for its daring and awesome feats of horsemanship, and the outstanding races that are done on fast ponies that have been native to the plateau for over two thousand years, the festival has a host of other features as well. Archery on horseback contests is a popular activity to watch, as are the other sporting events, such as tug-of-war, weightlifting, and many other local sports.

Geography and climate

Average low temperatures are below freezing from early/mid-October to late April; however, due to the wide diurnal temperature variation, the average high never lowers to the freezing mark. Despite frequent rain during summer, when a majority of days sees rain, only June, the rainiest month, has less than 50% of possible sunshine; with monthly percent possible sunshine ranging from 49% in June to 66% in November, the city receives 2,496 hours of bright sunshine annually. The residents of Yushu City reported seeing a large meteor fireball falling from the sky into the horizon on December 23, 2020.

Administrative divisions
Yushu comprises two towns: Gyêgu (Jiégǔzhèn; also known as "Yushu" from its position as the city seat) and Longbao.

Yushu City is divided to 4 subdistricts, 2 towns and 6 townships.
Subdistricts

Towns
 Longbao
 Laxiu

Townships

Transportation
The city is served by the China National Highway 214 and the recently constructed (opened 2009) Yushu Batang Airport.

See also
2010 Yushu earthquake

References

External links
  Yushu-Website in Chinese - 
 

County-level divisions of Qinghai
Amdo
Yushu Tibetan Autonomous Prefecture
Cities in Qinghai